On January 12, 2018, The Wall Street Journal reported that in October 2016, just before the 2016 United States presidential election, Michael Cohen, lawyer for then-presidential candidate Donald Trump, arranged a payment of $130,000 to pornographic film actress Stormy Daniels to stop her disclosing an affair she and Trump allegedly had in 2006. Daniels had signed a non-disclosure agreement (NDA). At first, Cohen denied Trump had the alleged affair and sought to suppress the allegation based on the NDA, but a month later publicly acknowledged making the payment.

Besides the allegations of the affair itself, the acknowledged payment raised legal and ethical questions as to whether the payment violated federal campaign finance laws, either because the payment was not duly disclosed as a campaign contribution or because campaign funds may have been used towards the payment. On February 13, Cohen said he paid the money out of his own pocket, not as a campaign contribution; and that neither The Trump Organization nor the Trump campaign reimbursed him for making it. On April 5, Trump said he had no knowledge of Cohen's payment; but on April 26 admitted for the first time that Cohen represented him in "the Stormy Daniels deal". On May 2, Trump's new lawyer Rudy Giuliani said that Trump had reimbursed Cohen for the payment.

In August 2018, Cohen pleaded guilty to eight criminal charges, including a campaign finance violation for Daniels's payment. He stated under oath that he paid her "in coordination with and at the direction of a candidate for federal office". Cohen was sentenced to three years in federal prison on various charges, and was disbarred.

Daniels filed three lawsuits against Trump and/or Cohen. In the first lawsuit she argued that the NDA was invalid. She won the lawsuit, though it was dismissed after Trump and Cohen agreed not to enforce the NDA. A California court subsequently ordered Trump pay $44,100 to reimburse her legal fees. She lost the second lawsuit, in which she argued she was defamed, and was ordered to pay almost $300,000 in legal fees and court sanctions. In the third lawsuit she claimed that Cohen colluded with her previous attorney Keith Davidson against her interests when he negotiated the payment. The lawsuit did not name Trump as a defendant, and settled in May 2019.

Trump's accounting firm, Mazars, provided his tax returns and related documents to the Manhattan District Attorney, Cyrus Vance Jr., following the outcome of the Supreme Court's Trump v. Vance ruling in February 2021. The potential liability of Trump and other potential charges against Cohen arising from the payments to Daniels had yet to be determined and resolved. Although an internal report said there was "reason to believe" Trump's campaign had knowingly violated campaign finance law, the Federal Election Commission (FEC) abandoned an inquiry into the payment to Daniels. The FEC's vote on May 6, 2021, split 2–2 along party lines.

Allegation and non-disclosure agreement
Both the blog The Dirty and the magazine Life & Style published the first reports of an alleged 2006 affair between Trump and Daniels (the latter took a polygraph test) in October 2011. Daniels talked about the alleged affair with the gossip magazine In Touch Weekly, who chose not to publish the interview after Cohen threatened to sue the magazine around the same time. The Wall Street Journal reported on January 12, 2018, that Cohen paid Daniels $130,000 in October 2016, a month before the election, to stop her discussing the alleged affair.

Cohen denied the existence of the affair on behalf of his client Donald Trump on January 14 but acknowledged on February 13 that he paid Daniels $130,000.

Daniels filed a lawsuit against Trump on March 6, 2018, claiming that the non-disclosure agreement she signed about the alleged affair was invalid since Trump never personally signed it despite acknowledging that she accepted the payment made in exchange for her silence in the matter. It also alleged that Trump's attorney tried to intimidate Daniels and "scare her into not talking". Cohen initiated an ex parte arbitration process the next day that resulted in an order barring Daniels from disclosing "confidential information" related to the non-disclosure agreement. The order that Daniels's lawyers called "bogus" was to remain confidential.

In an interview with 60 Minutes that aired March 25, 2018, Daniels said that she and Trump had sex once. She also said that she was threatened in front of her infant daughter after a fitness class in Las Vegas in 2011. The threat pressured her to later sign a non-disclosure agreement.

FBI agents raided Cohen's office and seized emails, tax documents, and business records relating to several matters, including the payment to Daniels, on April 9, 2018.

Status of Cohen's payment
Daniels's lawyer said that the $130,000 payment to her was a cover-up, while others also raised questions about whether the payment violated federal campaign finance laws, which may be the case if campaign funds were involved. The Wall Street Journal reported on January 12, 2018, that Daniels was paid $130,000 after a non-disclosure agreement via a Delaware limited liability company called Essential Consultants LLC that Cohen created for the purpose. The political watchdog group Common Cause filed a complaint on January 22, calling on the Federal Election Commission (FEC) and U.S. Department of Justice to investigate if the reported payout violated campaign finance rules, saying the alleged payment amounted to an in-kind donation to Trump's presidential campaign that should have been publicly disclosed in its official reports.

Cohen responded to The New York Times on February 13 that he paid Daniels the $130,000 from his own pocket, not as a campaign contribution, and that neither the Trump Organization nor the Trump campaign reimbursed him for making it. The Washington Post later noted that Cohen never ruled out the possibility that Trump reimbursed Cohen for the payment stating that he used his own money to "facilitate" it. Cohen said on March 13 that he transferred funds from his home equity line of credit to Essential Consultants LLC and from the company to Daniels's attorney.

On April 5, 2018, Trump claimed that he had no knowledge of Cohen's payment to Daniels but admitted that Cohen represented him in "the Stormy Daniels deal" for the first time on April 26. Trump's new lawyer Rudy Giuliani said on May 2 that Trump reimbursed Cohen for the payment, stating Trump "didn't know about the specifics of it but he did know about the general arrangement, that Michael [Cohen] would take care of things like this". Trump tweeted the next day that Cohen entered into the non-disclosure agreement and stated that Cohen was reimbursed for the $130,000 through monthly $35,000 retainer payments to him tweeting "Money from the campaign, or campaign contributions, played no  in this transaction". Trump contradicted Giuliani's statements on May 4, saying that Giuliani "wasn't familiar with everything" and that, "He started yesterday. He'll get his facts straight." Giuliani later released a statement saying "the payment was made to resolve a personal and false allegation in order to protect the President's family".

Cohen pleaded guilty to eight charges on August 21, 2018, including a campaign finance violation, for his role in the payment. He implicated Trump, saying that he acted "in coordination and at the direction of a candidate for federal office". Trump said that he only knew about the payments "later on", adding that the payments "didn't come out of the campaign, they came from me". The New York Times reported on August 22 that Cohen's court documents revealed two senior Trump Organization executives also involved in the hush-money payments. It also said that Cohen "coordinated with one or more members of the campaign, including through meetings and phone calls" about the payments.

Trump denied directing Cohen to make hush payments on December 13.

Legal issues
Common Cause filed complaints with the Department of Justice and the FEC claiming that the $130,000 payment to Daniels was a campaign contribution and that Trump's campaign violated campaign finance laws by not disclosing the payment to the FEC. If the payment was made by Cohen, there is also a question whether it is an illegal or undisclosed in-kind contribution to the Trump campaign. However, several members of Trump's legal team deny the payment related to the campaign, instead claiming that it was a personal payment, to save Trump's marriage. Questions have also been raised about how the payment was categorized for tax purposes, and if there is a possibility of tax-based charges or fees relating to the payment.

Daniels filed a civil suit in an attempt to nullify the non-disclosure agreement between Trump and her on March 6, 2018. The hearing set for July; but U.S. district judge S. James Otero pushed it back, citing the possible indictment of Cohen in the ongoing criminal probe by federal prosecutors.

Cohen also faces discipline from the State Bar of New York under the New York Rules of Professional Conduct that prohibits lawyers making loans to clients.

A well established principle of contract law is the offer and acceptance of "consideration" or something of value, in exchange for a promise to do something (or not do something, as in the case of a non-disclosure agreement]. Legal experts argue that the $130,000 payment being accepted by one party is valid consideration and enforceable regardless of the unsigned state of the Daniels non-disclosure agreement, but other elements in the Daniels agreement make predicting the outcome difficult. Issues like the use of pseudonyms and the disclosure exception for law enforcement investigations may favor Daniels's position.

Cohen pleaded guilty to eight charges on August 21, 2018, including tax fraud, bank fraud, and campaign finance violations, for his role in the payment, and implicated Trump, who in response said that he only knew about the payments "later on".

The Wall Street Journal reported on November 9, 2018, that federal prosecutors have evidence of Trump's "central role" in payments to both Stormy Daniels and Karen McDougal that violated campaign-finance laws.

Federal prosecutors implicated Trump in directing Cohen to commit the campaign finance law felonies that Cohen pleaded guilty in a sentencing memorandum for Cohen on December 7, 2018. Trump tweeted shortly after the memorandum court filing, "Totally clears the president. Thank you!" Cohen was sentenced to three years in federal prison.

NBC News reported on December 13, 2018, that Trump was present in an August 2015 meeting with Cohen and David Pecker when they discussed how American Media could help counter negative stories about Trump's relationships with women, confirming previous reporting by The Wall Street Journal.

The U.S. Attorney for the Southern District of New York investigated the possible role of Trump and others regarding concealment of hush-money payments, but indicated in a sealed court filing that it is unlikely to bring additional charges. On July 17, 2019, U.S. district judge William H. Pauley III, finding the investigation to be over, ordered that filing and materials related to the probe be unsealed on July 18, 2019.

Timeline

2018

January

On January 12, 2018, The Wall Street Journal reported that Michael Cohen paid Daniels $130,000 in October 2016, a month before the presidential election, to stop her discussing an affair she allegedly had with Trump in 2006. 

On January 14, Cohen denied the existence of an affair on behalf of his client, Trump, but acknowledged that he had paid Daniels $130,000. He also said that the payment was out of his own money. Initially, it was reported that the payment came via Essential Consultants LLC, a private company founded by Cohen in Delaware on October 17, 2016, which received £500,000 from Columbus Nova, an affiliate of Viktor Vekselberg's Renova Group. Daniels was reportedly in talks to tell her account to both Good Morning America and Slate at the time. The Daily Beast also discussed with Daniels "after three sources—including fellow porn star Alana Evans—told the website that both Daniels and Trump were involved. Daniels ultimately backed out on November3, just five days before the 2016 election."

On January 16, CNN reported that Fox News reporter Diana Falzone wrote an article about Daniels and Trump in October 2016, that Fox News never published. It included Daniels's then-manager Gina Rodriguez alleging on-the-record about a sexual relationship between them. CNN also reported that "Falzone had even seen emails about a settlement" between Daniels and Trump. In Touch Weekly published excerpts of a 2011 interview of Daniels alleging a 2006 extramarital affair with Trump the next day. The magazine described her account as being supported by a polygraph and corroborated by both her friend Randy Spears and her ex-husband Mike Moz. Although Cohen alleged that claims made in that interview were untrue and previously published in Life & Style magazine on October 24, 2011, The Daily Beast described the interviews as "hardly identical". Although Daniels declined to comment to Life & Style, the In Touch Weekly interview had direct quotes from Daniels.

On January 18, Mother Jones reported that Daniels considered running to become the senator for Louisiana in 2009, identified Trump as a potential campaign donor to a political consultant, and described details of a sexual relationship with Trump. That consultant discussed Daniels's revelations to another consultant in emails that Mother Jones obtained and published.

February
On February 13, Cohen publicly acknowledged paying Daniels $130,000 and said the payment was made with his own funds. He also said that neither the Trump Organization nor the campaign reimbursed him. Daniels's attorneys notified Cohen that by disclosing the payment Cohen was in breach of the NDA agreement, and so Daniels was no longer bound to it.

March
On March 5, The Wall Street Journal cited anonymous sources recounting Cohen as saying he missed two deadlines to pay Daniels since Cohen "couldn't reach Mr. Trump in the hectic final days of the presidential campaign" and that he complained that he had not been reimbursed for the payment after Trump's election. Cohen described this report as "fake news".

On March 6, Daniels filed a lawsuit against Trump in California Superior Court, claiming that the non-disclosure agreement never came into effect since Trump never signed it among other things. A complaint for declaratory relief, the suit seeks a judgment declaring that no agreement formed and for costs of the suit and other relief the Court deemed proper. The Court set a July hearing date.

On March 7, NBC News reported that Cohen initiated an ex parte private arbitration case against Daniels on February 27, 2018, and obtained a restraining order barring Daniels from disclosing "confidential information" related to the NDA agreement and stated that Daniels faces penalties for discussing her alleged relationship with Trump in public. Daniels's lawyers called the order bogus and was to remain confidential. White House press secretary Sarah Sanders said that President Trump's personal attorneys won an arbitration case "in the President's favor" against Daniels, and "there was no knowledge of any payments [to Daniels] from the President".

On March 14, documents surfaced indicating that Jill Martin, assistant general counsel for The Trump Organization, signed legal papers in connection with the restraining order against Daniels.

On March 16, Daniels's lawyer, Michael Avenatti, said on both CNN and MSNBC that Daniels had been threatened with physical harm if she was not silent about the alleged affair with Trump. Avenatti did not state when the threat was made, or who made it.

On March 16, Cohen asked for Daniels's suit to move from the state to federal court, based on the criteria that the parties live in different places and the amount at stake is more than $75,000 with Trump's approval. Cohen asserted that Daniels could owe up to $20 million in liquidated damages for breaching the agreement. The filing marked the first time that Trump himself, through his personal attorney, took part in the Daniels litigation.

On March 25, Daniels's involvement with Trump was the subject of a segment on the U.S. television news program 60 Minutes. The segment included interviews by Anderson Cooper with Daniels, her attorney Avenatti, and Trevor Potter, the former chairman of the FEC. Daniels said in her interview that she briefly spanked Trump with a copy of a Forbes magazine; had sex with Trump in the same encounter; later met Trump privately but not had sex on that occasion; and signed multiple false statements that the affair was not under pressure from her former business manager–lawyer. She also said that, while she was getting her infant daughter out of their vehicle in a Las Vegas parking lot, an unknown man showed up at the vehicle car and said "Leave Trump alone. Forget the story. That's a beautiful little girl. It'd be a shame if something happened to her mom".

April 2018

 April 5, 2018: Trump said he did not know about the $130,000 payment Cohen made to Daniels on Air Force One. He also said he was not aware of why Cohen had made the payment or where he got the money.
 April 9, 2018: FBI agents raid Cohen's office and seized emails, tax documents, and business records relating to several matters, including payments to Daniels. The raid conducted on behalf of the United States attorney for the Southern District of New York, and likely resulted from information uncovered from Mueller's investigation. Daniels reportedly cooperated with federal investigators following the raid.
 April 26, 2018: Trump said in an interview on Fox & Friends that Cohen "would represent me on some things. He represents me like with this crazy Stormy Daniels deal, he represented me". This is Trump's first admission of any relationship to the case.
 April 27, 2018: Judge put Stormy Daniels lawsuit on hold for at least 90 days while the criminal investigation of Cohen moves forward in New York since Cohen asserted his Fifth Amendment right not to incriminate himself while the criminal investigation continues.
 April 30, 2018: Daniels's lawyer Michael Avenatti, tweeted about a lawsuit filed against Trump, where Daniels currently sues Trump for his "recent irresponsible and defamatory statements" made against her. These statements appear in a tweet mocking the released police sketch of the man Daniels claims told her to drop her allegations of the affair, and have been claimed to be defamatory as they accuse Daniels of falsely accusing a person of threatening her.

May
 May 2, 2018: Trump's personal lawyer Rudy Giuliani said on Fox News that "the president repaid" Cohen the $130,000 that Cohen had paid to Daniels. He also said that Trump "did know the general arrangement" of Cohen's payment, but not "the specifics". This contradicts Trump's claim of April5 that he had no knowledge of the payment.
 May 3, 2018: Trump tweeted that Cohen entered into a non-disclosure agreement with Daniels. He tweeted that Cohen reimbursed for the $130,000 through monthly $35,000 retainer payments to him and wrote that "Money from the campaign, or campaign contributions, played no  in this transaction".
 May 4, 2018: Trump contradicted Giuliani's statements, saying that Giuliani "wasn't familiar with everything" and that "He started yesterday. He'll get his facts straight." Giuliani later released a statement saying "the payment was made to resolve a personal and false allegation in order to protect the President's family".
 May 5, 2018: Daniels appeared on Saturday Night Live, playing herself, in a sketch involving the president, played by Alec Baldwin, and mocking Trump with the line, "I know you don't believe in climate change but a storm's a-coming baby".
 May 9, 2018: CNN reported that Mueller's team questioned Russian oligarch Viktor Vekselberg about hundreds of thousands of dollars in payments his company's US affiliate made to Cohen. The US Treasury Department opened an investigation into the leak of Michael Cohen's private bank records to Michael Avenatti, the porn actress' lawyer, who sent a seven-page dossier to The New York Times and other news outlets.
 May 10, 2018: Newsweek reported that Michael Cohen's lawyers argued that some of the small transactions that Avenatti reported were for a different Michael Cohen but not denied that the large transaction were for their client. Greenberg Traurig, the former law firm of Giuliani, released a statement against Giuliani's claim that it was common practice for lawyers to make secret payments to individuals. A spokesperson for the firm stated: "We cannot speak for Mr. Giuliani.... Speaking for ourselves, we would not condone payments of the nature alleged to have been made or otherwise without the knowledge and discretion of a client."
 May 16, 2018: Trump acknowledged that Cohen was paid between $100,000 and $250,000 last year, out of which potentially came the $130,000 payment for Daniels, in his annual disclosure of personal finances required by the Office of Government Ethics. The form reports on page 45, "Mr. Cohen sought reimbursement of those expenses and Mr. Trump fully reimbursed Cohen in 2017. The category of the value would be $100,001 to $250,000..."
 May 24, 2018: Daniels's lawyer Avenatti filed a motion in federal court to have a judge allow Daniels's lawsuit to move forward, instead of continuing the 90-day hold placed last month. Avenatti cited recent statements by Trump and Giuliani, that potentially contradict Cohen's argument for the stay, with the recent disclosure of the Settlement Agreement and the "new facts call into question whether Mr. Cohen's Fifth Amendment rights..." in relation to the case are "as compelling as previously argued..."

June
 June 6, 2018: Daniels sued both Michael Cohen and her own former lawyer, Keith Davidson, accusing Cohen of encouraging Davidson to violate her attorney–client privilege. The lawsuit also alleges Trump was aware of the efforts for Daniels to deny the affair on media interviews.
 June 6, 2018: Trump's lawyer, Rudy Giuliani, verbally attacked Daniels, saying: "The business you were in entitles you to no degree of giving your credibility any weight... Explain to me how she could be damaged... If you're going to sell your body for money, you just don't have a reputation... a woman who sells her body for sexual exploitation I don't respect".
 June 19, 2018: Daniels's May 24 motion to reconsider denied. Avenatti said he would file an appeal shortly.

July 2018
 July 12, 2018: Undercover vice cops arrested Daniels in a sting operation in Columbus, Ohio. Officers alleged that Daniels "touched" three undercover officers in the club where she performed, which is against Ohio law. Two other female adult entertainers who were arrested at the club for the same alleged violations received summons to appear in court and did not have their mugshots taken, unlike Daniels while she booked into the county jail. Daniels retained Columbus defense lawyer Chase Mallory, who worked with prosecutors to dismiss the charges less than 12 hours later, citing that the law excluded out-of-town performers. It later reported that the lead detective on the vice squad in charge of the arrest was a supporter of Trump.

August
 August 21, 2018: Cohen officially surrendered to the FBI. He pleaded guilty to eight charges that afternoon: five counts of tax evasion, one count of making false statements to a financial institution, one count of willfully causing an unlawful corporate contribution, and one count of making an excessive campaign contribution at the request of a candidate or campaign. The plea deal reportedly does not include any agreement to cooperate with investigators. However, the plea includes both jail time and a substantial monetary fine. Cohen implicated Trump, but not identified him by name, in his plea. Daniels said she felt "vindicated" following the plea. It was also specified that Cohen had requested a reimbursement of $180,000, which Trump Organization officials doubled and added a bonus of $60,000 for a total payment of $420,000.
 August 22, 2018: The New York Times reported that Cohen court documents revealed that two senior Trump Organization executives also involved in the hush-money payments, and that Cohen "coordinated with one or more members of the campaign, including through meetings and phone calls" about the payments.
 August 23, 2018: Trump said the payment funds came from him personally and not from campaign funds during a Fox & Friends interview. He also said that he only knew about the payments "later on". These comments contradict earlier statements that Cohen gave while under oath. Cohen's lawyer Lanny Davis suggested that Trump be prosecuted for the crimes that he instructed Cohen to commit.

September
 September 7, 2018: Cohen offered to rescind and invalidate the non-disclosure agreement with Daniels, in return for Daniels refunding the $130,000 Cohen paid to her.
 September 8, 2018: Trump's lawyers declared that he would neither enforce the non-disclosure agreement nor contest Daniels's claim that it is invalid.
 September 10, 2018: Michael Avenatti argued lawsuit over 2016 non-disclosure agreement must be allowed to proceed in federal court since neither President Trump nor his former personal attorney has faced "any true consequences or a meaningful inquiry into the truth" in the case.
 September 12, 2018: Stormy Daniels announced a book titled Full Disclosure about her life that she says will include details of her tryst with Donald Trump.

October 
 October 15, 2018: Federal judge S. James Otero dismissed Daniels's defamation lawsuit against President Trump. He also ruled that Trump was entitled to receive attorney's fees from Daniels. Daniels's attorney Michael Avenatti immediately appealed to the U.S. Court of Appeals for the Ninth Circuit.

November 
 November 9, 2018: The Wall Street Journal reported that federal prosecutors have evidence of Trump's "central role" in payments to both Stormy Daniels and Karen McDougal that violated campaign-finance laws.

December 
 December 7, 2018: Federal prosecutors implicated Trump in directing Cohen to commit the campaign finance law felonies Cohen pleaded guilty to in a sentencing memorandum for Cohen. Trump tweeted shortly after the memorandum court filing, "Totally clears the president. Thank you!"
 December 11, 2018: Daniels was ordered to pay $293,052.33 in attorney's fees, costs, and sanctions, less than half the amount demanded by Trump's lawyers, in relation to the defamation lawsuit that Judge Otero dismissed in October 2018.
 December 12, 2018: Cohen was sentenced to 3 years' imprisonment for having paid $130,000 hush money (characterized in the charges as an "excessive campaign contribution") to Daniels during Trump's election campaign.

2019

May 
 May 6, 2019: Cohen began his prison term in a federal prison in Otisville, New York.

July
 July 17, 2019: The federal investigation into the hush payments announced as closed.
 July 18, 2019: Unsealed documents released, and show that the FBI suspected that Trump talked to both Cohen and Hope Hicks at the time about "the need" to keep Daniels from going public before the presidential election.

August 
 August 1, 2019: The New York County district attorney subpoenaed the Trump Organization for records related to the hush-money payments.

September
 September 2, 2019: The House Judiciary Committee prepared to investigate Trump's alleged involvement in the 2016 hush-money payments to both Daniels and Karen McDougal.
 September 11, 2019: NBC and CNN reported that Cohen entered into a proffer agreement with the Manhattan prosecutor to provide information on the matter.

2020

August 
 August 1, 2020: Daniels lost her appeal in the defamation lawsuit against Trump.
 August 22, 2020: A California judge ordered Trump to pay Daniels's legal fees as the prevailing party due to his September 2018 agreement not to enforce the NDA.

2021

February 
 February 22, 2021: The Supreme Court declined to take up the defamation case, making Daniels's loss final.

May 
 May 6, 2021: The FEC dropped an inquiry into whether the payment to Stormy Daniels violated campaign financial law during the 2016 election. The FEC split 2–2 along party lines on taking action. The vote came months after an internal report recommended that there was "reason to believe" Trump's campaign had knowingly violated campaign finance law.

2022

March
 March 18, 2022: The 9th Circuit (U.S. District Court for the Central District of California) responded to an appeal on the final ruling in Daniels's lawsuit against Trump, wherein she owes nearly $300,000 in attorney fees, costs, and sanctions (not including appeal costs) to the injured party. Allegations of an affair remain unproven, and the final court ruling on the matter was affirmed by the USCA asserting that Stephanie Clifford has suffered a loss in court, owing damages, leaving no merit for further appeal on the matter.  
 Upon the ruling against Daniels, she tweeted "I will go to jail before I pay a penny."
 March 22, 2022: Former President Donald Trump called the ruling "a total and complete victory and vindication for, and of me."  He also reiterated his initial claim that he never had sex with Daniels, and claimed that the lawsuit was purely a political stunt.

November 

 November 21, 2022: The New York Times reported that Manhattan district attorney Alvin Bragg's office "has moved to jump-start its criminal investigation into Donald J. Trump['s]" reported "hush-money payment to a porn star who said she had an affair with Mr. Trump."

2023

January 
 January 17, 2023: Michael Cohen met with Bragg's office following the sentencing of Allen Weisselberg.
 January 30, 2023: The Manhattan district attorney's office was scheduled to present evidence to a grand jury regarding Trump's role in the payment.
 January 31, 2023: Trump wrote on Truth Social that "the 'Stormy' nonsense ... is VERY OLD & happened a long time ago. ... there was NO reason not to rely on [Cohen], and I did." Daniels asserted that this was an admission to the truth of her claims.

February
 February 1, 2023: Cohen said he had given his cellphones to the DA's prosecutors, who wanted evidence of communications, including voice recordings, of Daniels's former lawyer Keith Davidson.

March
  March 18, 2023: On this day, Trump stated that he expected to be placed under arrest the following Tuesday (March 21), on unspecified charges at the behest of New York prosecutors. The BBC suggested that the charges related to allegations of 'hush money' payments to Daniels.

See also
 
 2017–18 United States political sexual scandals

References

2018 controversies in the United States
2018 in American politics
2018 scandals
Adultery
Campaign finance in the United States
Donald Trump controversies
Donald Trump litigation
Federal political sex scandals in the United States
Presidential scandals in the United States
Trump administration controversies